Hawkesbay, as it is often written in Pakistan, is Hawke's Bay and may refer to:

 Hawke's Bay, a bay on the Arabian Sea, west of Karachi, south of Kiamari Town
 Hawke's Bay Beach, a beach in Karachi, Sindh, Pakistan
 Hawke's Bay Town, a new neighborhood being developed in Karachi, Sindh, Pakistan

See also
 Hawke's Bay (disambiguation)